Pedro Nolasco Gandarillas Luco (December 25, 1839 - November 11, 1891) was a Chilean politician. He was born in Santiago. He was a graduate of the Instituto Nacional General José Miguel Carrera. He served in the Government of Chile under Presidents Domingo Santa Maria and José Manuel Balmaceda.

Members of the Chamber of Deputies of Chile
People from Santiago
Suicides in Chile
1839 births
1891 deaths
Chilean Ministers of Finance
Instituto Nacional General José Miguel Carrera alumni